Stephen Masters (born 10 September 1969) is a Danish lightweight rower. He won a bronze medal at the 1986 World Rowing Championships in Nottingham with the lightweight men's eight.

References

1969 births
Living people
Danish male rowers
World Rowing Championships medalists for Denmark
Rowers at the 1992 Summer Olympics
Olympic rowers of Denmark